Jean-Paul Girres (born 6 January 1961) is a Luxembourgian former footballer. A midfielder, he played for the Luxembourg national football team and three club sides.

Club career 

Girres began playing for Union Luxembourg in 1977 before moving to Avenir Beggen in 1983. There he won two Luxembourg National Division titles and two Luxembourg Cups. In 1991 he joined Swift Hesperange and retired in 1992.

International career 

Girres first played for Luxembourg in 1980 in a defeat against Yugoslavia. He went on to appear 58 times for Luxembourg and scored two goals in his twelve-year international career.

International goals 

 Scores and results list Luxembourg's goal tally first, score column indicates score after each Girres goal.

Honours
Luxembourg National Division: 2
 1983–84, 1985–86

Luxembourg Cup: 2
 1983–84, 1986–87

References

1961 births
Living people
Luxembourgian footballers
Luxembourg international footballers
Association football midfielders
Union Luxembourg players
FC Avenir Beggen players
FC Swift Hesperange players